KPRC-FM (100.7 FM) is a radio station broadcasting a Spanish adult hits format. Licensed to Salinas, California, United States, it serves the Santa Cruz area.  The station is currently owned by iHeartMedia, Inc.  Its studios are in Salinas, and the transmitter is on Mount Toro, 10 miles south.

References

External links

PRC-FM
Radio stations established in 1964
PRC-FM
1964 establishments in California
IHeartMedia radio stations